The 1978–79 Egyptian Premier League, was the 22nd season of the Egyptian Premier League, the top Egyptian professional league for association football clubs, since its establishment in 1948. The season started on 13 October 1978 and concluded on 6 April 1979.
Al Ahly managed to win the league for the 15th time in the club's history.

League table

 (C)= Champion, (R)= Relegated, Pld = Matches played; W = Matches won; D = Matches drawn; L = Matches lost; F = Goals for; A = Goals against; ± = Goal difference; Pts = Points.

Top goalscorers

Teams

Teams location

References

External links 
 All Egyptian Competitions Info

5
1978–79 in African association football leagues
1978–79 in Egyptian football